Bayua is a village on the shores of Lake Maninjau in Agam Regency, in the Indonesian province of West Sumatra. Most of the people in Maninjau are ethnically Minangkabau.

Populated places in West Sumatra